Melaleuca lateralis is a plant in the myrtle family, Myrtaceae and is endemic to the south-west of Western Australia. It is a showy shrub, well suited to horticulture, distinguished by its very small leaves and small clusters of pink flowers along the older stems.

Description 
Except on the youngest growth, the leaves and branches are glabrous.

This species flowers profusely with deep pink flowers in clusters along the stems. The stamens are arranged in five bundles around the flower, each bundle containing 4 to 12 stamens.

Taxonomy and naming
This species was first described in 1852 by the Russian botanist Nikolai Turczaninow in Bulletin de la classe physico-mathématique de l'Académie Impériale des sciences de Saint-Petersburg. The specific epithet (lateralis) is "in reference to the inflorescence being inserted on the branchlets and branches below the leaves".

Distribution and habitat
Melaleuca lateralis occurs in and between the Stirling Range and Lake King districts in the Esperance Plains, Jarrah Forest and Mallee biogeographic regions. It grows in sandy gravel on floodplains.

Conservation status
Melaleuca lateralis is listed as "not threatened" by the Government of Western Australia Department of Parks and Wildlife.

References

lateralis
Myrtales of Australia
Rosids of Western Australia
Plants described in 1852
Endemic flora of Western Australia
Taxa named by Nikolai Turczaninow